Alison Pockett (born 1966) is an English female former track cyclist.

Cycling career
Pockett became a British track champion after winning the British National Individual Sprint Championships in 1984.

References

1966 births
English female cyclists
English track cyclists
Sportspeople from Sutton Coldfield
Living people